The South Coast of Texas is the fourth studio album by Texas singer-songwriter Guy Clark, released in 1981.

Guests include Ricky Skaggs, Rosanne Cash and Vince Gill as well as numerous well-known session players. Skaggs would later have a hit with "Heartbroke", and Rodney Crowell, who produced the album, with "She's Crazy for Leavin'".

Reception

Allmusic stated in its review: "South Coast of Texas was a transition album toward the mature Clark style, one that was first to emerge on his next album, Better Days. It's not a landmark in his catalog, but neither is it anything that could remotely be considered a failure."

Track listing
All songs written by Guy Clark except as noted.
 "Who Do You Think You Are" – 3:26
 "Crystelle" – 3:05
 "New Cut Road" – 3:45
 "Rita Ballou" – 3:14
 "South Coast of Texas" – 3:48
 "Heartbroke" – 2:58
 "The Partner Nobody Chose" (Guy Clark, Rodney Crowell) – 3:08
 "She's Crazy for Leavin'" (Clark, Crowell) – 2:52
 "Calf-Rope" – 2:35
 "Lone Star Hotel" – 3:24

Personnel
Guy Clark – vocals, guitar
Richard Bennett – guitar, concertina, triangle, lap steel guitar
Rodney Crowell – guitar, background vocals
Hank DeVito – guitar, pedal steel guitar
Emory Gordy – guitar, bass, mandolin, piano
Glen D. Hardin – keyboards
Larrie Londin – drums, percussion
Frank Reckard – guitar
Ricky Skaggs – background vocals
Rosanne Cash – background vocals
Vince Gill – background vocals

Production notes
Rodney Crowell – producer
Donivan Cowart – engineer
Paul Brookside – liner notes

Chart positions

References

1981 albums
Guy Clark albums
Warner Records albums
Albums produced by Rodney Crowell